Estes Farm is a historic home and farm complex located near Dyke, Albemarle County, Virginia. It includes a c. 1840 log dwelling and a c. 1880 wood framed main house, as well as numerous supporting outbuildings including a large barn (c. 1840), an icehouse/well house (c. 1880), a tenant house (c. 1880), the log dwelling (c. 1840), a small hay/tobacco barn (c. 1920), a garage (c. 1900), and three small sheds.  Also on the property is a contributing truss bridge (c. 1915). The house is a two-story, three-bay frame I-house building with a hipped roof. A two-story half-hipped central rear ell was added in 1976. It is representative of a transitional Greek Revival / Italianate style. It features a one-story three-bay porch fronting the central entrance, and exterior-end brick chimneys.

It was added to the National Register of Historic Places in 2006.

References

Houses on the National Register of Historic Places in Virginia
Farms on the National Register of Historic Places in Virginia
Greek Revival houses in Virginia
Italianate architecture in Virginia
Houses completed in 1880
Houses in Albemarle County, Virginia
National Register of Historic Places in Albemarle County, Virginia